Gino Bramieri (21 June 1928 – 18 June 1996) was an Italian comedian and actor. He was especially known as a television comedian, but also performed in theatres, on radio, and in about thirty movies. He was nicknamed "Il Re della barzelletta" ("the King of jokes") for his burlesque comic style, which was largely based on his skill at telling funny stories. His jokes were sometimes as quick as a cut and thrust, and bordering on surrealism. They have been collected in a series of books, such as 50 chili fa ("50 kilos ago", a collection he published after dieting).

Biography 

Bramieri was born in Milan, Italy, into a humble family.  He made his stage debut in 1943, with the prose company in prose of Egisto Olivieri. He later graduated in accountancy at night school.  In 1948 he got married and had a son.  Bramieri's career was launched by Erminio Macario, who entered him in his revue company in 1949.  In his career, he has performed together with many prominent Italian comedians and actors, including Franco and Ciccio, Peppino De Filippo, Aldo Fabrizi, Ave Ninchi, Nino Taranto, Raimondo Vianello, Renato Rascel, and Totò. His career in television reached its apex in the 1960s–1970s, with RAI television shows such as Tigre contro tigre, Il signore ha suonato?, E noi qui and others; in the 1980s, he conducted a show named after him, the Gino Bramieri show (aka G.B. Show).

He died of cancer at the age of 67, and was buried in Milan's Cimitero Monumentale.

A street of Milan (district of Porta Nuova) as well as an avenue in Rome (in the Pineto city park) have been renamed in his honour.

Filmography
 Siamo tutti Milanesi, directed by Mario Landi (1953)
 Loving You Is My Sin, directed by Sergio Grieco (1953)
 The Three Thieves, directed by Lionello De Felice (1955)
 Avanzi di galera, directed by Vittorio Cottafavi (1955)
 Per le vie della città, directed by Luigi Giachino (1956)
 Peppino, le modelle e chella là, directed by Mario Mattoli (1957)
 Scandali al mare, directed by Marino Girolami (1961)
 Maciste contro Ercole nella valle dei guai, directed by Mario Mattoli (1961)
 Twist, lolite e vitelloni, directed by Marino Girolami (1962)
 Nerone '71, directed by Filippo Walter Ratti (1962)
 L'assassino si chiama Pompeo, directed by Marino Girolami (1962)
 Il medico delle donne, directed by Marino Girolami (1962)
 Gli eroi del doppio gioco, directed by Camillo Mastrocinque (1962)
 Canzoni a tempo di twist, directed by Stefano Canzio (1962)
 Colpo gobbo all'italiana, directed by Lucio Fulci (1962)
 I tre nemici, directed by Giorgio Simonelli (1962)
 Gli italiani e le donne, directed by Marino Girolami (1962)
 Un marito in condominio, directed by Angelo Dorigo (1963)
 Siamo tutti pomicioni, directed by Marino Girolami (1963)
 I quattro tassisti, directed by Giorgio Bianchi (1963)
 Adultero lui, adultera lei, directed by Raffaello Matarazzo (1963)
 In ginocchio da te, directed by Ettore Maria Fizzarotti (1964)
 Se non avessi più te, directed by Ettore Maria Fizzarotti (1965)
 Non son degno di te, directed by Ettore Maria Fizzarotti (1965)
 Rita la zanzara, directed by Lina Wertmüller (1966)
 Perdono, directed by Ettore Maria Fizzarotti (1966)
 Nessuno mi può giudicare, directed by Ettore Maria Fizzarotti (1966)
 Chimera, directed by Ettore Maria Fizzarotti  (1968)
 Nel giorno del Signore, directed by Bruno Corbucci (1970)
 W le donne, directed by Aldo Grimaldi (1970)
 Per amore di Cesarina, directed by Vittorio Sindoni (1976)
 Oh! Serafina, directed by Alberto Lattuada (1976)
 Ride bene... chi ride ultimo directed by Bramieri
 Maschio latino cercasi, directed by Giovanni Narzisi (1977)
 Ridendo e scherzando, directed by Marco Aleandri (1978)

Television

Plays 

Esami di maturità of Ladislao Fodor, directed by Mario Landi (1954)
 Manettoni e Pippo Fantasma, directed by Alda Grimaldi (1960)
 Biblioteca di Studio Uno: Il dottor Jekyll e mister Hyde, directed by Antonello Falqui (1964)
 Biblioteca di Studio Uno: Al Grand Hotel]], directed by Antonello Falqui (1964)
 Graditi ospiti, directed by Vito Molinari (1967)
 Felicita Colombo, directed by Antonello Falqui (1968)
 Mai di sabato signora Lisistrata, directed by Vito Molinari (1971)
 Un mandarino per Teo, directed by Eros Macchi (1974)
 Anche i bancari hanno un'anima, directed by Pietro Garinei and Gino Landi (1979)
 La vita comincia ogni mattina, directed by Pietro Garinei (1981)

Sitcom 
 Nonno Felice, directed by Giancarlo Nicotra (1992-1995)
 Norma e Felice, directed by Giancarlo Nicotra and  Beppe Recchia (1995)

Gallery

References

Italian male film actors
Italian male comedians
Male actors from Milan
1928 births
1996 deaths
Burials at the Cimitero Monumentale di Milano
20th-century Italian male actors
Italian male television actors
Italian male stage actors
Deaths from cancer in Lombardy
20th-century Italian comedians